Rennweg is the name of:
 Rennweg (Zürich)
 Rennweg am Katschberg 
 Neuhaus am Rennweg

Railway stations 
Rennweg station (Nuremberg U-Bahn), an underground railway station in Nuremberg, Germany
Wien Rennweg railway station, a railway station in Vienna, Austria